Janów may refer to:

 Janów, Chełm County in Lublin Voivodeship (east Poland)
 Janów, Lublin County in Lublin Voivodeship (east Poland)
 Janów, Podlaskie Voivodeship (north-east Poland)
 Janów, Gmina Bełchatów in Łódź Voivodeship (central Poland)
 Janów, Gmina Zelów in Łódź Voivodeship (central Poland)
 Janów, Brzeziny County in Łódź Voivodeship (central Poland)
 Janów, Gmina Bedlno in Łódź Voivodeship (central Poland)
 Janów, Gmina Oporów in Łódź Voivodeship (central Poland)
 Janów, Gmina Góra Świętej Małgorzaty in Łódź Voivodeship (central Poland)
 Janów, Łódź East County in Łódź Voivodeship (central Poland)
 Janów, Pajęczno County in Łódź Voivodeship (central Poland)
 Janów, Gmina Łęki Szlacheckie in Łódź Voivodeship (central Poland)
 Janów, Gmina Wolbórz in Łódź Voivodeship (central Poland)
 Janów, Rawa County in Łódź Voivodeship (central Poland)
 Janów, Skierniewice County in Łódź Voivodeship (central Poland)
 Janów, Tomaszów Mazowiecki County in Łódź Voivodeship (central Poland)
 Janów, Wieluń County in Łódź Voivodeship (central Poland)
 Janów, Gmina Parzęczew in Łódź Voivodeship (central Poland)
 Janów, Gmina Zgierz in Łódź Voivodeship (central Poland)
 Janów, Puławy County in Lublin Voivodeship (east Poland)
 Janów, Kielce County in Świętokrzyskie Voivodeship (south-central Poland)
 Janów, Końskie County in Świętokrzyskie Voivodeship (south-central Poland)
 Janów, Gmina Ożarów in Świętokrzyskie Voivodeship (south-central Poland)
 Janów, Gmina Tarłów in Świętokrzyskie Voivodeship (south-central Poland)
 Janów, Pińczów County in Świętokrzyskie Voivodeship (south-central Poland)
 Janów, Grójec County in Masovian Voivodeship (east-central Poland)
 Janów, Kozienice County in Masovian Voivodeship (east-central Poland)
 Janów, Lipsko County in Masovian Voivodeship (east-central Poland)
 Janów, Mińsk County in Masovian Voivodeship (east-central Poland)
 Janów, Otwock County in Masovian Voivodeship (east-central Poland)
 Janów, Przysucha County in Masovian Voivodeship (east-central Poland)
 Janów, Radom County in Masovian Voivodeship (east-central Poland)
 Janów, Gmina Brochów in Masovian Voivodeship (east-central Poland)
 Janów, Gmina Młodzieszyn in Masovian Voivodeship (east-central Poland)
 Janów, Warsaw West County in Masovian Voivodeship (east-central Poland)
 Janów, Zwoleń County in Masovian Voivodeship (east-central Poland)
 Janów, Konin County in Greater Poland Voivodeship (west-central Poland)
 Janów, Krotoszyn County in Greater Poland Voivodeship (west-central Poland)
 Janów, Turek County in Greater Poland Voivodeship (west-central Poland)
 Janów, Silesian Voivodeship (south Poland)
 Janów, Opole Voivodeship (southwest Poland)
 Janów, Warmian-Masurian Voivodeship (north Poland)

See also 
Janow, a village in Neuendorf B, Germany
 Ivano-Frankove (Polish name Janów), Ukraine
Janów Karwicki, a village in the Łódź Voivodeship, central Poland
Janów Lubelski, a town in the Lublin Voivodeship, east Poland
Janów-Mikołajówka, a village in the Masovian Voivodeship, east-central Poland
 Janów-Nikiszowiec, a district of Katowice, a city in Poland
Janów Podlaski, a village in the Lublin Voivodeship, east Poland
 Janów Poleski, the Polish name for Ivanava, a town in Belarus
Janov (disambiguation)
Janowo (disambiguation)